Small Town Saturday Night may refer to:

Small Town Saturday Night (film)
"Small Town Saturday Night" (song), by Hal Ketchum